Business as Usual is the second full-length collaboration album released by Haystak & JellyRoll on November 19, 2013. The collaboration album peaked at 11 on the Billboard Top Heatseakers Albums chart.

Track listing
 "Business As Usual" - 3:26
 "All Over The Road ft. Charlie P" - 4:21
 "Money" - 3:14
 "Boyfriend" - 3:29
 "Independent Legend" - 3:12
 "Keep It Gangsta" - 3:20
 "Winners ft. Robin Raynelle" - 3:51
 "Please God" - 2:36
 "Hello ft. Big Snap" - 4:02
 "We Don't" - 3:25
 "Bad Guy ft. Squints" - 3:33
 "Party Girl ft. Big Snap, Zodiak Black & Charlie P" - 5:01
 "Over Here" - 3:37
 "Early Days" - 2:45
 "Life ft. Ryan Terrel" - 4:10
 "Safely Say" - 3:23
 "Every Now and Then" - 3:27
 "Locked And Loaded" - 3:42
 "Where I've Been (Bonus Track)" - 4:26
 "Them Babies (Bonus Track)" - 3:58
 "I'm Gone Win (Bonus Track)" - 3:38

References

External links
https://itunes.apple.com/us/album/business-as-usual/id728184705

Haystak albums
2013 albums
Jelly Roll (singer) albums